Tsangpo is the suffix attached to names of rivers originating or sometimes flowing through the Tsang province of Tibet, including:

 Kyirong Tsangpo, in its lower reaches known as Trishuli River
 Matsang Tsangpo is the formal Tibetan names for Bhote Koshi, a tributary of Sun Kosi.
 Raga Tsangpo
 Rongshar Tsangpo is a tributary of Tamakoshi River.
 Yarlung Tsangpo, the upper Brahmaputra River in Tibet